Greek heraldry, though not as developed as in other countries, has an interesting history by drawing upon its Byzantine heritage and influences from the various western powers that have occupied Greek lands. Heraldry is therefore seen as a foreign concept, and is widespread mostly in the Ionian and Aegean Islands (former Venetian and Genoese possessions) and among the families of Phanariot origin

Ancient Greeks were among the first civilizations to use symbols consistently in order to identify a warrior, clan or a state. In Aeschylus’ tragedy Seven Against Thebes there is  the first record of a shield blazon.

See also
 Byzantine heraldry
 Coat of arms of Greece

External links
 The Greek Royal Heraldry 1863-1967

Heraldry by country
Heraldry